Jowzar or Juzar may refer to:
 Jowzar-e Bakesh, Fars Province
 Jowzar-e Javid, Fars Province
 Jowzar, Isfahan
 Jowzar, Kohgiluyeh and Boyer-Ahmad
 Jowzar Rural District, in Fars Province